Andaman is an Indian Hindi-language film directed by Smita Singh. The film is based on COVID crisis. It's starring Sanjay Mishra, Rajesh Tailang, Anand Raaj, Anamica Kadamb, Jay shanker Pandey, Rakesh Pandey, Ambrish Bobby and Saurabh Dwivedi. The film is produced by 8 Pillar Motion Pictures. It was released on 20 November 2021 on OTT platforms.

Cast 
Sanjay Mishra as a boatman (cameo appearance)
Rajesh Tailang as UPSC Interview panel chairman (cameo appearance)
Anand Raaj as Abhimanyu Pratap, Panchayat Secretary of Bhullanpur
Anamica Kadamb
Jay shanker Pandey
Rakesh Pandey
Ambrish Bobby
Saurabh Dwivedi
Amrita Pal
Shreya Awasthi
Anshul Shukla
Arav Aryawanshi as Rahul, Ranvijay Singh's brother
Vishal Agiran
Piyush Verma
Sandeep Kumar
Vinay Kumar Mishra
Dinesh Awasthi
Amitabh Mishra

Plot 
Andaman is an inspirational social drama about a quarantine centre in an unprivileged village. It unfolds the difficulties encountered by the villagers in the quarantine centre and is rooted in the daily life challenges of common people in rural areas.

Production 
The pre-production of the film was started in September 2020 and the production completed in November 2020. The film is extensively shot in Uttar Pradesh.

References

External links 
 

2020s Hindi-language films
2021 films